Sokol Novocheboksarsk was an ice hockey team in Novocheboksarsk, Russia. They played in the VHL-B, the third level of Russian ice hockey. The club was founded in 1975 and folded in 2016.

External links
 Official site

Ice hockey teams in Russia
Sport in Chuvashia
1975 establishments in Russia
Ice hockey clubs established in 1975
Ice hockey clubs disestablished in 2016
2016 disestablishments in Russia